The 2005 Big East Men's Basketball Championship was played from March 9 to March 12, 2005.  The tournament took place at Madison Square Garden in New York City.  The Syracuse Orange won the tournament and were awarded an automatic bid to the 2005 NCAA Men's Division I Basketball Tournament.

Bracket

Note: By finishing in last place during the regular season, St. John's did not qualify for the tournament.

Games
1st round:  Wednesday, March 9
Noon

2PM

7PM

Quarterfinals:  Thursday, March 10
Noon

2 PM

7 PM

9 PM

Semifinals:  Friday, March 11
7 PM

9 PM

Finals:  Saturday, March 12
9 PM

Awards
Dave Gavitt Trophy (Most Outstanding Player): Hakim Warrick, Syracuse

All-Tournament Team
Gerry McNamara, Syracuse
Josh Pace, Syracuse
Mike Gansey, West Virginia
Kevin Pittsnogle, West Virginia
Randy Foye, Villanova

References

  Big East Championship Results

Tournament
Big East men's basketball tournament
Basketball in New York City
College sports in New York City
Sports competitions in New York City
Sports in Manhattan
Big East men's basketball tournament
Big East men's basketball tournament
2000s in Manhattan
Madison Square Garden